Valentyna Fyodorovna Arkanova (5 February 1934, in Kherson – 12 June 2013, in Kharkiv) was a Soviet and Ukrainian singer, coloratura soprano, and teacher. In 1968, she was awarded People's Artist of the Ukrainian SSR. She was awarded the Order of Princess Olga.

Life 
In 1957, she graduated from Kharkiv Conservatory, where she studied with L. E. Kurylenko.

Beginning in 1956, she was a soloist at Kharkiv Opera and Ballet Theater.

In 1971, she was lecturer at Kharkiv Institute of Arts. In 1978, she was associate professor, and then Professor at the Kharkiv National Kotlyarevsky University of Arts.

She was a member Inter-Regional Branch of the National Union of Theater Workers of Ukraine. In 1994, she was on the jury of the Solomiya Krushelnytska Opera Singers Competition.

References 

1934 births
2013 deaths
20th-century Ukrainian women opera singers
Musicians from Kherson
Recipients of the Order of Merit (Ukraine), 3rd class
Recipients of the Order of Princess Olga, 3rd class
Recipients of the Order of the Red Banner of Labour
Ukrainian music educators
Ukrainian operatic sopranos
Soviet music educators
Soviet women opera singers
Soviet sopranos